These are the official results of the athletics competition at the 2009 Mediterranean Games taking place on 30 June – 3 July 2009 in Pescara, Italy.

Men's results

100 meters

Heats – 1 JulyWind:Heat 1: +2.2 m/s, Heat 2: +2.4 m/s

Final – 1 JulyWind:+1.0 m/s

200 meters

Heats – 1 JulyWind:Heat 1: –0.2 m/s, Heat 2: +1.1 m/s

Final – 30 JuneWind:–0.4 m/s

400 meters

Heats – 1 July

Final – 2 July

800 meters

Heats – 30 June

Final – 2 July

1500 meters
2 July

5000 meters
3 July

10,000 meters
2 July

Half marathon
3 July

110 meters hurdles

Heats – 30 JuneWind:Heat 1: +0.1 m/s, Heat 2: +0.4 m/s
	 

Final – 30 JuneWind:–0.4 m/s

400 meters hurdles

Heats – 2 July

Final – 3 July

3000 meters steeplechase
2 July

4 × 100 meters relay
2 July

4 × 400 meters relay
3 July

20 kilometers walk
30 June

High jump
1 July

Long jump
3 July

Triple jump
30 June

Shot put
3 July

Discus throw
1 July

Hammer throw
2 July

Javelin throw
30 June

Women's results

100 meters

Heats – 1 JulyWind:Heat 1: +1.3 m/s, Heat 2: +1.8 m/s

Final – 1 JulyWind:+1.0 m/s

200 meters

Heats – 1 JulyWind:Heat 1: +0.4 m/s, Heat 2: +1.3 m/s

Final – 1 JulyWind:+0.4 m/s

400 meters

Heats – 1 July

Final – 2 July

800 meters

Heats – 1 July

Final – 2 July

1500 meters
2 July

5000 meters
1 July

10,000 meters
30 June

Half marathon
3 July

100 meters hurdles

Heats – 1 JulyWind:Heat 1: +0.3 m/s, Heat 2: +0.5 m/s

Final – 2 JulyWind:–0.1 m/s

400 meters hurdles
1 July

4 × 100 meters relay
2 July

High jump
3 July

Pole vault
30 June

Long jump
1 July

Triple jump
2 July

Shot put
2 July

Discus throw
3 July

Hammer throw
30 June

Javelin throw
2 July

References
Results

Mediterranean Games
2009 Results